The 38th Hong Kong Film Awards presentation ceremony took place at the Hong Kong Cultural Centre on 14 April 2019.

Winners and nominees 
Winners are listed first, highlighted in boldface, and indicated with a double dagger .

References

External links
 Official website of the Hong Kong Film Awards

2018 film awards
2019 in Hong Kong
April 2019 events in China
2019
Hong